This list of tallest buildings in Corpus Christi ranks high-rises in the U.S. city of Corpus Christi, Texas by height. The tallest building in Corpus Christi is the 28-story One Shoreline Plaza South Tower, which rises 411 feet (125 m) and was completed in 1988.   It also stands as the tallest building in Texas south of San Antonio. The building is located on a complex which also contains the second tallest building in the city at 375 feet (114 m). The third tallest building is the Frost Bank Plaza. It stood as the city's tallest building from 1983 to 1988.

The history of skyscrapers in Corpus Christi began with the construction of the Wilson Plaza East Building in 1927, formerly known as the Wilson Tower. Most of Corpus Christi's tall buildings are located downtown; however, there are some high-rises scattered throughout other areas of the city. However, no Corpus Christi buildings are among the tallest in the United States.

As of April 2011, there are no skyscrapers under construction or being proposed in Corpus Christi.

Tallest buildings
This lists ranks Corpus Christi high-rises that stand at least 165 feet (50 m) tall, based on standard height measurement. An equal sign (=) following a rank indicates the same height between two or more buildings. The "Year" column indicates the year in which a building was completed.

References

Corpus Christi
Tallest
Corpus Christi